Martti Haukioja (born 6 October 1999) is a Finnish professional footballer who plays as a left back for Seinäjoen Jalkapallokerho in the Finnish Veikkausliiga. He previously played for FC Inter Turku and visited FC Jazz and the youth ranks of Chievo on loan.

Career

VPS
Haukioja signed with VPS for the 2019 season. The deal was confirmed already on 14 November 2018.

References

1999 births
Living people
Finnish footballers
FC Ilves players
FC Jazz players
Vaasan Palloseura players
FC Inter Turku players
Seinäjoen Jalkapallokerho players
Veikkausliiga players
Kakkonen players
Association football defenders
Sportspeople from Pirkanmaa